is a private university in Kitakyushu City, Fukuoka Prefecture, Japan, established in 1978.

External links
  Official website
 Official website 

Educational institutions established in 1978
Private universities and colleges in Japan
Universities and colleges in Fukuoka Prefecture
1978 establishments in Japan
Medical schools in Japan